The 2020 Kyrgyz Premier League was the 29th season of the Kyrgyzstan League, Kyrgyzstan's top division of association football organized by the Football Federation of Kyrgyz Republic. The season started in March 2020, with nine teams participating.

Teams
Prior to the start of the season, Akademija Osh was split in to two clubs, FC Kaganat and FC Lider.

''Note: Table lists in alphabetical order.

Foreign players
The number of foreign players is restricted to five per USL team. A team can use only five foreign players on the field in each game.

League table
</onlyinclude>

Results

Top scorers

References

References

External links

Kyrgyzstan League seasons
1
Kyrgyzstan